Alope spinifrons is a shrimp of the family Hippolytidae, the broken-back shrimps.

Distribution
Known from New Zealand at least.

References

 ZipCodeZoo

Hippolytidae
Marine crustaceans of New Zealand
Animals described in 1837